The Abilene Aces were a West Texas League baseball team based in Abilene, Texas, United States that played from 1928 to 1929. They reached the league finals in 1928, ultimately losing the playoff. Notable players include Debs Garms and Euel Moore.

References

Baseball teams established in 1928
Baseball teams disestablished in 1929
Defunct minor league baseball teams
Defunct baseball teams in Texas
Baseball teams in Abilene, Texas
1928 establishments in Texas
1929 disestablishments in Texas